The Magnolia Bridge, built in 1930, connects the Seattle neighborhoods of Magnolia and Interbay over the filled-in tidelands of Smith Cove. It is one of only three road connections from Magnolia to the rest of Seattle. It carries W. Garfield Street from Magnolia Way W. in the west to the intersection of Elliott and 15th Avenues W. in the east. Having been damaged in the 2001 Nisqually earthquake, it is currently scheduled for replacement.

In 1910, when a bridge was first proposed for this location, Queen Anne Hill and Magnolia were already connected by several trestles across Interbay, each spanning the railway that ran north–south through Interbay. By 1912 a wooden trestle had been built. The wooden trestle was replaced by a concrete structure in 1930 and improved in 1957 to provide a grade separation from Elliott Avenue West.  In 1960 the bridge was renamed from the "Garfield Street Bridge" to the "Magnolia Bridge" as a result of community efforts by Magnolia residents.

The bridge's support columns were damaged by the 2001 Nisqually earthquake, temporarily closing it for repairs. As part of disaster-relief funding after the earthquake, a replacement for the Magnolia Bridge was granted $9 million in federal funds, but design of the new bridge stalled in the late 2000s.

See also
 List of Seattle bridges

References

External links

City of Seattle
Replacement project

Bridges in Seattle
Bridges completed in 1929
Road bridges in Washington (state)
Magnolia, Seattle
Concrete bridges in the United States
Trestle bridges in the United States